Line 2 of the Bilbao metro is a rapid transit line in Biscay, Basque Country, Spain. It runs from Basauri to Kabiezes. Its route covers the municipalities of Basauri and Etxebarri, the city of Bilbao and the left bank of the Nervión river. The line has 25 stations.

History 
The first phase of the line opened on 13 April 2002, with five stations; Gurutzeta/Cruces, Ansio, Barakaldo, Bagatza and Urbinaga. Line 2 joins line 1 at San Ignazio, and from that station both lines continue along the same route to Etxebarri (when line 2 opened the southern terminus for both lines was Bolueta).

On 8 January 2005, two stations were added: Sestao to the north and Etxebarri to the south (Etxebarri also serves as the southern terminus for line 1).

On 20 January 2007, the line was extended with two new stations: Portugalete and Abatxolo, both in the municipality of Portugalete.

On 4 July 2009, two more stations were opened: Peñota and Santurtzi, in Portugalete and Santurtzi respectively. The Mamariga shuttle, a funicular railway which serves as an access to Santurtzi station, opened in late 2010.

In 2011, the line was extended southwards with two new stations, Ariz opening on 28 February and Basauri on 11 November. Both stations are in the municipality of Basauri.

On 28 June 2014, Kabiezes station opened, in the municipality of Santurtzi. Its opening marked the completion of the line as originally planned.

Station list

Notes

References

External links 

 Metro Bilbao
 

02
Transport in Bilbao
Railway lines opened in 2002
2002 establishments in the Basque Country (autonomous community)
Metre gauge railways in Spain
1500 V DC railway electrification